King's Highway 400, commonly referred to as Highway400, historically as the Toronto–Barrie Highway, and colloquially as the400, is a 400-series highway in the Canadian province of Ontario linking the city of Toronto in the urban and agricultural south of the province with the scenic and sparsely populated central and northern regions. The portion of the highway between Toronto and Lake Simcoe roughly traces the route of the Toronto Carrying-Place Trail, a historic trail between the Lower and Upper Great Lakes. North of Highway 12, in combination with Highway 69, it forms a branch of the Trans-Canada Highway (TCH), the Georgian Bay Route, and is part of the highest-capacity route from southern Ontario to the Canadian West, via a connection with the mainline of the TCH in Sudbury. The highway also serves as the primary route from Toronto to southern Georgian Bay and Muskoka, areas collectively known as cottage country.

Highway400 is the second longest freeway in the province, the trans-provincial Highway 401 being the longest. It was the first fully controlled-access highway in Ontario when it was opened between North York and Barrie on July1, 1952. On that date, it was also the first highway to be designated as a 400-series. The freeway was extended in both directions; north of Barrie to Coldwater in 1958, and south of Highway401 to Jane Street in 1966. It was widened between North York and Barrie in the 1970s. Since 1977, construction on the freeway has been snaking north along Highway69 towards Parry Sound and Sudbury.

As of 2011, a four lane freeway is opened as far north as Carling; at that point, the four lanes narrow into two and continue northerly to Sudbury as Highway69. At the north end of Highway69, a segment of freeway is in operation between north of the French River and Sudbury; while this section will be part of the completed Highway400 route, at present it remains signed as Highway69. The remaining gap between Carling and north of the French River will be opened in stages as construction is undertaken and completed.

Route description 

 
While Highway400 was originally known as the Toronto–Barrie Highway, the route has been extended well beyond Barrie to north of Parry Sound, and is projected to reach its eventual terminus in Sudbury in the 2020s.

Highway 400 begins at the Maple Leaf Drive overpass in Toronto, south of Highway 401. South of that, it is known as Black Creek Drive, a high speed commuter road once planned as a southern extension of Highway 400. Highway 400 had been completed to Jane Street in 1966 (alongside the expansion of Highway 401) but plans to extend Highway 400 further south to the Gardiner Expressway were cancelled after several citizens groups protested the proposal in the 1970s. Black Creek Drive was built along the empty right-of-way and transferred to Metro Toronto in 1982.

North of Maple Leaf Drive, the highway shifts northwestward as it meets Jane Street at a parclo interchange, with the Black Creek river snaking under the highway and on/off ramps. The highway then turns approximately northward at Highway401. At the interchange with Highway401, Highway400 widens to twelve lanes. It continues north, losing two lanes at Finch Avenue.

Crossing Steeles Avenue and a railway line as it enters the Regional Municipality of York, the freeway has a junction with Highway407 which is the only four-level stack interchange in the Greater Toronto Area. The section between Highway407 and Langstaff Road in suburban Vaughan features a short collector-express system, with the collector lanes serving interchanges with Highway7 and Langstaff Road, while the express lanes have access to Highway407. North of Langstaff Road, the freeway passes west of Vaughan Mills shopping centre and Canada's Wonderland theme park.

From Highway401 to the Holland Marsh the freeway largely parallels the arterial/concession roads Weston Road and Jane Street, passing over the height of land at the Oak Ridges Moraine. The highway passes through protected rural areas in northern York Region and encounters rolling countryside in Simcoe County south of Barrie. Between Major Mackenzie Drive and King Road, Highway 400 features HOV lanes which have acceleration/deceleration lanes at entry/exit points. Just a bit north of the Simcoe Road88 exit, Highway400 will meet the future Bradford Bypass. The section near Barrie is subject to snowsqualls as it lies near the edge of Georgian Bay's snowbelt.

Within Barrie, Highway400 passes through a trench which places it below grade for most of its length, the route curving around downtown Barrie towards the north-east.  On the outskirts of Barrie, the through right-of-way continues as Highway 11 towards Orillia and North Bay, while Highway400 exits and veers 90degrees to the north-west towards Georgian Bay, travelling alongside the former Highway 93 to Craighurst.
At Craighurst the highway again turns north-east, skirting the Copeland Forest and the ski hills of the Oro Moraine, to meet Highway 12, which runs concurrently with the 400 between Exits141 and 147, in Coldwater. From here, the highway takes on the Trans-Canada Highway designation, and follows a predominantly north-western heading along what was the route of Highway69, toward the planned terminus of Sudbury. In Muskoka and Parry Sound Districts, Highway400 is in most sections a twinned four-lane highway, but several bypasses have and are being built to circumvent the communities along the way.
At Port Severn, the highway meets the rugged Canadian Shield, and winds its way north through the granite, often flanked by towering slabs of rock.

History

Initial construction 
Highway400, along with Highway401 and Highway402, was one of the first modern freeways in Ontario. Planning for the Toronto–Barrie Highway, which would become Highway400, began in 1944. The two routes connecting Barrie with Toronto at the time, Highway 11 and Highway 27, were becoming congested. Grading on a new alignment between Weston Road and Jane Street was completed from Wilson Avenue to Highway27 (Essa Road) by 1947. The onset of the Korean War slowed construction on the highway considerably,
and it wasn't until December1, 1951 that two lanes (one in each direction) would be opened to traffic. All four lanes were opened to traffic on July1, 1952, at which point the highway was designated Highway 400. The name was the scorn of one newspaper editor, who published his distaste for using numbers to name a highway.
The freeway featured a  grass median.

Shortly after its completion, Hurricane Hazel struck on October15, 1954. Several bridges and sections of road were washed away by Hazel. The damaged highway and bridges were completely reconstructed after the water was pumped away.

Expansion 

By 1958 Highway 400 was extended north parallel with Highway 93 as a two-lane "super two" with at-grade intersections to Craighurst and construction had begun to extend it further to connect to Highway 12 and Highway 103 south of Coldwater. Both sections opened to traffic on December 24, 1959.
For many years afterwards, and still today to older drivers, this portion of the highway (or sometimes even the entire stretch to Parry Sound) north of Barrie is referred to as the "400 Extension".

Plans were also conceived to extend the freeway south from Highway 401 to Eglinton Avenue, where it would join two new expressways: the Richview and the Crosstown Expressways. These plans would never reach fruition, as public opposition to urban expressways cancelled most highway construction in Toronto by 1971.
Highway 400 would still open as far south as Jane Street on October 28, 1966,
before the rest of the plans were shelved following the cancellation of the Spadina Expressway. The province used the right-of-way in the Black Creek valley to construct a four-lane divided expressway with signalled intersections as far south as Eglinton Avenue. Originally known as the Northwest Arterial Road, the expressway was transferred to Metropolitan Toronto on March 1, 1983, and named Black Creek Drive. In exchange, the province was given the expropriated land purchased for Spadina south of Eglinton Avenue.

Widening of Highway 400 began in 1971. The first section to be widened was from Highway 401 to Finch Avenue, which was widened to eight lanes. Soon thereafter, the section from Finch to Highway 88 was widened to six lanes.

The super two north of Barrie was twinned starting in 1977, necessitated by the increasing use of the highway by recreational  traffic. This work involved the construction of two southbound lanes parallel to the original, with a  median between them. In addition, at-grade intersections were converted into grade-separated interchanges. This work was completed as far as Highway 93 north of Craighurst by 1982. In 1980 construction began on four-laning the section from Highway 93 to Simcoe County Road 19,
which was completed by the end of 1982. During the summer of 1983, four-laning began between Simcoe County Roads 19 and 23, bypassing west of Coldwater. This was completed during the summer of 1985. The old northern terminus of Highway400 south of Coldwater (Exit137) is today known as Lower Big Chute Road.

Between 1985 and 1987, the pace of construction slowed temporarily as the foundations for a new southbound structure over Matchedash Bay on Highway 69 (former Highway 103) just north of Highway 12 were compacted and settled. During the fall of 1987, a contract was awarded to extend the four-laning north to Waubaushene and to complete the interchange with Highway 12,
first constructed when the super two was extended from Coldwater to Waubaushene in the late 1970s.
This work was completed a year later during the fall of 1988.

Highway400 was expanded and upgraded through Vaughan in the late 1980s and early 1990s, largely in tandem with the construction of Highway407, with a collector-express system added to separate traffic at the Highway407 interchange from access to Highway 7 and Langstaff Road.
The cloverleaf interchange with Highway7 was reconfigured to a partial cloverleaf in 1987–88. The northbound lanes of Highway400 were shifted to a temporary diversion between Steeles Avenue and Highway7, bypassing the original alignment in order to facilitate construction of the four-level interchange with Highway407, which was completed in 1990.
Portions of this diversion were later retained for the ramps to and from Highway407, which opened on June 7, 1997.

Twinning Highway 69 
North of Highway 12, Highway 400 transitioned into the two-lane Highway 69. Several structures were constructed over the next few years in preparation for twinning Highway 69. In 1988 construction began on the southbound structures over Matchedash Bay and the Canadian National Railway crossing north of Highway 12. Both were complete by the end of 1990. During 1991, construction began on the interchanges at Quarry Road and Port Severn Road, new service roads between those interchanges and the southbound structure over the Trent–Severn Waterway.

Following the twinning of Highway 69 (which was not redesignated as Highway 400 until 1997, several years after completion) to Port Severn, the next target became Parry Sound. In 1988 construction began on the southbound structures over Matchedash Bay and the Canadian National Railway crossing north of Highway 12. Both were complete by the end of 1990. During 1991, construction began on the interchanges at Quarry Road and Port Severn Road, new service roads between those interchanges and the southbound structure over the Trent–Severn Waterway. This work was carried out through the 1990s, reaching as far as Muskoka Road 38 (former Highway 660) by 1999.
The four-laning was extended north to the Musquash River in October 1999, although an interchange wasn't constructed at Muskoka Road 32/38 until October 2005.
However, a land claim dispute between the Government of Ontario and the Wahta Mohawks prevented the twinning of the highway between the Musquash and Moon Rivers. The Territorial Reserve did not oppose the construction; however, the land was unobtainable due to a technicality requiring a minimum voter turnout of 65percent.

Construction of the Parry Sound Bypass, a new alignment from Badger Road to the Seguin River, began with an interchange along Highway 518 at the site of the future freeway, which was completed during the autumn of 1999.
Construction south of the interchange to Badger Road started in November 1999, while the section north of the interchange to the Seguin River began three months later.

On February 7, 2000, the government officially committed to complete Highway 400 to Parry Sound. Work began on two projects as a result of this: a  bypass of Highway 69 on a new alignment between the Moon River, south of MacTier, and Rankin Lake Road near Horseshoe Lake, as well as a  segment connecting that to the Parry Sound Bypass.

The first segment of freeway to be completed north of the Musquash River was the Parry Sound Bypass, which opened on November 1, 2001.
This section bypassed to the east of the old highway, now known as Oastler Park Drive. However, it was numbered as Highway 69 for the moment. In October 2002, the section south of the Parry Sound Bypass to Rankin Lake Road was opened. This was followed a year later on October 7 with the opening of the bypass of Highway 69 from the Moon River to Rankin Lake Road, connecting with the Parry Sound segment. At that point, the Highway 400 designation was extended north to the Seguin River. However, the Highway 69 designation remained in place as far south as the Musquash River.

The remaining  gap through the Wahta Mohawk Territory would eventually be constructed, starting in December 2004.
It opened to traffic during the summer of 2008,
completing the freeway south of Parry Sound. Since then, the Highway 69 designation has been removed south of Nobel.

Since 2000 

As one of the oldest 400-series freeways, several vintage overpasses have been demolished in recent years to accommodate the future widening of Highway 400 to ten lanes in the section from Vaughan to Barrie. Sixteen of these historic structures, sub-standard by today's freeway requirements, remained as of summer 2009, with all slated for replacement in the near future. In order to preserve some of this heritage the Ministry of Transportation created an 1800mm x 1625mm reusable urethane mould of the provincial coat-of-arms from the 5th Line overpass located south of Bradford, which will be used to decorate the replacement structures.

The interchanges at Rutherford Road and Major Mackenzie Drive in Vaughan were extensively reconstructed to modern configurations in 1993 and 2004, respectively, while a new partial interchange was added for Bass Pro Mills Drive in 2004 to serve the Vaughan Mills shopping centre. In late 2010, the Portage Road overpass crossing Highway 400 was opened. The Highway9 (Davis Drive) overpass was initially twinned with an addition span on the north side in the late 1990s, however this still permitted only six lanes of Highway400 to pass underneath, so a decade later the twin structures were replaced with a wider single bridge that was long enough to accommodate future widening of the freeway to eight lanes.
The North Canal bridges are to be replaced in order to accommodate eventual expansion of the route and increase vertical clearance over Canal Road.

Construction began north of Barrie in April 2013 to replace the overpass at the Crown Hill junction with Highway 11.
The new structure, designed to accommodate future highway expansion, was completed in October 2015. The original overpass, built during the 1950s, was demolished during an overnight closure on December 13, 2015. The overall cost of this project was C$8.5 million.

On February 27, 2014, a major snowsquall affected Highway 400 in Innisfil with heavy wind gusts and near-zero visibility. A total of 96 vehicles were involved in a major collision that ensued near Innisfil Beach Road. Although no injuries were reported, the highway was closed for a day and buses were shuttled in to warm stranded motorists.

In 2017, the provincial government announced the widening of Highway 400 from Major Mackenzie Drive to King Road from 6 lanes to 8 lanes with HOV lanes. The southbound HOV lane was opened on September11, 2021, while the northbound lane opened two months later on November11.

As a precursor to the eventual reconfiguration of the Highway 89 junction, the Cookstown service centre was closed on February 1, 2013, while its replacement was shifted to a new site north of Fourth Line while being rebranded as Innisfil ONRoute and it reopened in June 2015. Construction to replace the Highway 89 overpass and realign the interchange to a parclo, with new ramps to be built in the NW quadrant where the service centre was formerly located, commenced in 2019 with an expected completion set for 2021.

Future 
On June 28, 2005, it was officially confirmed that Highway 69 would be twinned and bypassed north to Highway 17 in Sudbury. This announcement was accompanied by a time line with the completion date set for 2017;
in March 2015, the Ministry of Transportation acknowledged that the original completion date would not be met, and announced that its current goal is to have the project completed in the 2020s. However, work was already underway in 2003 to expand Highway 69 south of Sudbury to four lanes.
As work is completed at the southern end near Nobel, the Highway 400 designation will be extended north.

Construction began on the segment from Sudbury southwards to Estaire in 2005, while route planning studies were completed for the Estaire to Parry Sound segment. Portions of the route will be opened to traffic in segments as contracts are fulfilled; the segment between Sudbury and Estaire opened on November 12, 2009,
while the Nobel bypass from Parry Sound to Highway 559 opened October 26, 2010. As the Sudbury segment of the Highway 69 freeway is discontinuous with Highway 400, it will not be renumbered until the twinning of the intervening section is completed.

On October 27, 2010, one lane in either direction on the Nobel Bypass opened to traffic. The new four-lane bypass, which travels as far north as Highway 559, was fully opened in November. The former route of Highway 69 through the town was renamed as Nobel Drive and was reduced in width from four to two lanes, with a recreational trail constructed alongside the road.
Some businesses in Nobel were affected after the opening of the new highway 400 realignment and had to be closed down.

Services 
There are four service centres located along the southern section of Highway 400: Maple, King City, Innisfil and Barrie. The centres were originally leased to and operated by several major gasoline distributors; however, those companies chose not to renew their leases as the terms end. In response, the MTO put the operation of the full network of service centres out for tender, resulting in a 50-year lease with Host Kilmer Service Centres, a joint venture between hospitality company HMSHost (a subsidiary of Autogrill) and Larry Tanenbaum's investment company Kilmer van Nostrand, which operates them under the ONroute brand.

Three of the four service centres were upgraded and feature a Canadian Tire gas station, an HMSHost-operated convenience store known as "The Market", as well as fast food brands such as Tim Hortons, A&W and Burger King. The southbound Vaughan service centre, which had been redeveloped in the late 1990s, was not included in these plans. The Barrie centre closed for reconstruction on October 19, 2010. The King City service centre relocated a few hundred meters south in October 2012. The Cookstown centre was located at the Highway 89 interchange being incorporated into the southbound ramp (while accessible to northbound traffic by exiting on westbound Highway 89 then turning at a driveway on the west side of the 400) and it closed on February 1, 2013, while its replacement was shifted to a new site north of Fourth Line while being rebranded as Innisfil ONRoute and it reopened in June 2015. Service centres are located at the following points along Highway 400:

North of Barrie, where average traffic volumes do not warrant large service centres with direct highway access, there are two additional service campuses, located on crossroads at interchanges in Port Severn (Exit 156) and at Seguin Trail (Exit 214) near Parry Sound, operated by Petro Canada.

Exit list

References 

Bibliography

External links 

 Highway 400 Live Traffic Cams
 Highway 400 extension Route Planning Studies
 Highway 400 at OntHighways.com

00
Ontario 400
Proposed roads in Canada

Transport in King, Ontario
Transport in Parry Sound, Ontario
Transport in Barrie
Transport in Vaughan